La République des Meteors (The Republic of Meteors) is the eleventh studio album by French band Indochine. It was released on 9 March 2009, in France. It peaked at #2 on the French Albums Chart and was certified Platinum in France.

The single "Le lac" charted at 11 in France, 5 in Belgium and 31 in Switzerland.

Track listing

A limited edition of the album was released with a second disc.

Charts

Weekly charts

Year-end charts

References

2009 albums
Indochine (band) albums